Tribe was an American alternative rock band from Boston, Massachusetts, United States, which was active in the late 1980s and early 1990s. They released three albums including two on Slash Records/Warner Bros. Records. They were finalists in the 1988 WBCN Rock 'n' Roll Rumble.

However, their popularity in Boston did not translate their local appeal into national fame and they disbanded in 1994.

Greg LoPiccolo later stated that "When Warner Bros didn’t pick up our option for the third album; that was kind of a momentum-killer."

Terri and Eric Brosius and Greg LoPiccolo later joined video game developer Looking Glass Studios and did sound/voice/music work on various games. They would later become founding members of Guitar Hero developer Harmonix.

"Outside", a song from Here at the Home, was featured in the 2007 music video game Rock Band.

Current status
Terri Brosius helped form Boston band The Vivs, where she is the keyboard player and backing vocalist. They released their debut album, "Mouth to Mouth", in 2009.

Eric Brosius is a member of the Boston band Eddie Japan, which also features Greg LoPiccolo's brother Bart on guitar.

Janet LaValley is co-founder and lead singer for the darkwave/indie band, Murdoch. Murdoch released their first album, "Gone", in 2021.  Janet had a song called "Jube" on the soundtrack for the movie, That's What She Said.

Discography

Albums
 Tribe (EP) (1987)
 Here at the Home (1990)
 Abort (1991)
 Sleeper (1993)

Singles
 "Jakpot" (1990)
 "Easter Dinner" (1991)
 "Payphone"(1991)
 "Joyride (I Saw the Film)" (1991)
 "Supercollider" (1993)
 "Red Rover" (1993)

Members

 Janet LaValley: vocals, rhythm guitar (1985–1994)
 Terri Barous: keyboard, backing vocals (1985–1994)
 Eric Brosius: lead guitar, backing vocals (1985–1994)
 Greg LoPiccolo: bass, backing vocals (1985–1994)
 David Penzo: drums, percussion (1985–1994)
 Mike Levesque: drums, percussion (live shows only) (1994–1994)

References

External links
 The Lost Bands: Searching for ... Tribe (bullz-eye.com)
 The Lost Bands: Searching for ... Follow Up (bullz-eye.com

Alternative rock groups from Massachusetts
Musical groups from Boston
Musical groups established in 1985
Musical groups disestablished in 1994
Slash Records artists
1985 establishments in Massachusetts